Crab Orchard may refer to:

People
 Crab Orchard Culture of Mound Builders in prehistoric America

Places 
 Crab Orchard, Illinois
 Crab Orchard, Kentucky
 Crab Orchard, Nebraska
 Crab Orchard, Tennessee
 Crab Orchard, West Virginia
 Crab Orchard Mountains in Tennessee
 Crab Orchard National Wildlife Refuge in Southern Illinois
 Crab Orchard Lake, located in the Crab Orchard National Wildlife Refuge
 Crab Orchard Wilderness, located in the Crab Orchard National Wildlife Refuge

Railroad 
 Crab Orchard & Egyptian Railroad

Other 
 Crab Orchard Series in Poetry Open Competition Awards